Sterna is a settlement in the Evros regional unit of Greece. It is located around 9 kilometers west of Nea Vyssa and northwest of Orestiada, on low hills between the rivers Evros and Arda.

Population

History
Sterna was ruled by the Ottoman Empire until the Balkan Wars of 1913, when it joined Bulgaria. After  the Greco-Turkish War (1919-1922) it was ceded to Greece.

See also

List of settlements in the Evros regional unit

External links
Greek Travel Pages - Sterna

References

Vyssa
Populated places in Evros (regional unit)